Menter's Shear Stress Transport turbulence model, or SST, is a widely used and robust two-equation eddy-viscosity turbulence model used in Computational Fluid Dynamics.   The model combines the k-omega turbulence model and K-epsilon turbulence model such that the k-omega is used in the inner region of the boundary layer and switches to the k-epsilon in the free shear flow.

History
The SST two equation turbulence model was introduced in 1994 by F.R. Menter to deal with the strong freestream sensitivity of the k-omega turbulence model and improve the predictions of adverse pressure gradients. The formulation of the SST model is based on physical experiments and attempts to predict solutions to typical engineering problems. Over the last two decades the model has been altered to more accurately reflect certain flow conditions.  The Reynold's Averaged Eddy-viscosity is a pseudo-force and not physically present in the system.  The two variables calculated are usually interpreted so k is the turbulence kinetic energy and omega is the rate of dissipation of the eddies.

SST (Menter’s Shear Stress Transport) turbulence model

Variable Definition

The constants β, σk, σω are computed by a blend from the corresponding constants via the following formula

Constants

K-W Closure
 , 
 ,

K-e Closure
 , 
 ,

SST Closure Constants
 ,

Boundary and Far Field Conditions

Far Field

Boundary/Wall Conditions

Most software implementations like OpenFOAM and ANSYS Fluent do not include the factor of 10 for omega at the wall, following a Wilcox formulation. However in  F.R. Menter states: "present author found it much easier and as accurate to implement the following boundary condition"

Validation with experimental results
A good agreement between mass-transfer simulations with experimental data were attained for turbulent flow using the SST two equation turbulence model developed by F.R. Menter for rectangular and tubular shapes, a modified hydrocyclone and for curved rotating systems taking into account a curvature correction term.

References

Notes
 'CFD Online Wilcox k-omega turbulence model description'. Accessed May 12, 2014. http://www.cfd-online.com/Wiki/Wilcox%27s_k-omega_model
 'An Introduction to Computational Fluid Dynamics: The Finite Volume Method (2nd Edition)', H. Versteeg,  W. Malalasekera; Pearson Education Limited; 2007; 
 'Turbulence Modeling for CFD' 2nd Ed., Wilcox C. D. ; DCW Industries ; 1998 ; 
 'An introduction to turbulence and its measurement', Bradshaw, P. ; Pergamon Press ; 1971 ; 

Turbulence models